Olesya Pervushina and Anastasia Potapova were the defending champions, but Pervushina chose not to participate. Potapova partnered Galina Voskoboeva, but lost in the first round to Natela Dzalamidze and Nina Stojanović.

Olga Doroshina and Anastasiya Komardina won the title, defeating Veronika Pepelyaeva and Anastasia Tikhonova in the final, 6–1, 6–2.

Seeds

Draw

Draw

References
Main Draw

O1 Properties Ladies Cup - Doubles